Elmhurst is a town in the Pyrenees region of western Victoria, Australia. The town is on the Pyrenees Highway between Eversley and Amphitheatre. The headwaters of the Wimmera River form near Elmhurst. At the 2021 census, Elmhurst had a population of 185.

Mount Cole and the Mount Buangor State Park are located south of Elmhurst.

The general store is now closed.  Elmhurst has a small post office that is open limited hours Monday-Friday (9am - 1pm).

The Elmhurst Recreation Reserve (on Green st) has public toilets, a picnic area and a playground.

Gallery

References

External links

Towns in Victoria (Australia)